In Limbo may refer to:

In Limbo (novel), by Christopher Evans
In Limbo (album) by Pete Max
In Limbo (EP) by Lydia Lunch
In Limbo (film), a 2021 Russian crime film
In Limbo: The Lost Puracane Sessions, an album by Puracane
"In Limbo", a song by Genesis from the album From Genesis to Revelation
"In Limbo", a song by Radiohead from the album Kid A
Development hell, also called "in limbo", a period during which a film or other project is trapped in development
an undetermined stay in Limbo, a theoretical place between life and death